Vera Huckel (1908–1999) was an American mathematician and aerospace engineer and one of the first female "computers" at NACA, now NASA, where she mainly worked in the Dynamic Loads Division.

Life and work
Huckel was born in 1908 and studied math at the University of Pennsylvania, graduating in 1929. After living in California for ten years, she visited a friend in Newport News and was hired as a ''junior computer,'' doing mathematical calculations for other researchers for $1,440 a year (a man with her background typically earned about $2,000 a year). Before the invention of electronic computers, these so-called "computers," who were mostly women, would do the time-consuming calculations necessary for successful flights. 

Huckel became one of the first female engineers at NASA and wrote the program for its first electronic computer. She also worked as a supervisory mathematician and aerospace engineer during her time at NACA/NASA. By 1945 she had been promoted to section head in charge of up to 17 other women. 

She was involved in helping researchers make the switch from using slide rules to do their complex calculations to super computers. She also worked on theories of aerodynamics. As a mathematician, she was involved in the testing of sonic booms in supersonic flight.

Huckel retired from NASA in 1972 after working there for more than 33 years. 

She was active in the Soroptomist Organization, the AAUW, and volunteered with the Hampton United Way.

Huckel died at 90 years of age on March 24, 1999, in Newport News, Virginia, where she had lived for more than 60 years. She was buried in West Laurel Hill Cemetery in Bala Cynwyd, Pennsylvania.

Selected publications 

 Morgan, Homer G., Harry L. Runyan, and Vera Huckel. "Theoretical considerations of flutter at high Mach numbers." Journal of the Aerospace Sciences 25, no. 6 (1958): 371-381.
 Morgan, Homer G., Vera Huckel, and Harry L. Runyan. Procedure for calculating flutter at high supersonic speed including camber deflections, and comparison with experimental results. No. NACA-TN-4335. 1958.
 Hilton, David Artland, Vera Huckel, Domenic J. Maglieri, and R. Steiner. Sonic-boom exposures during FAA community response studies over a 6-month period in the Oklahoma City area. No. NASA-TN-D-2539. 1964.
 Hilton, David A., Vera Huckel, and Domenic J. Maglieri. Sonic-boom measurements during bomber training operations in the Chicago area. Vol. 3655. National Aeronautics and Space Administration, 1966.

References

See also 
 Harvard Computers

1908 births
1999 deaths
American mathematicians
Women mathematicians
NASA people
American women mathematicians
People from Newport News, Virginia
21st-century American mathematicians
21st-century American women scientists
21st-century American scientists
University of Pennsylvania